Montgomery Steele is a Canadian country music artist. Steele's 1997 album, First Time Out, became the first 100% Canadian content debut CD to chart five consecutive Top 30 singles on the RPM charts. Steele's Top 30 singles include "Indian Woman," "In This Heart of Mine," "The River Song," "Red Wine Kisses" and "Debbie Darlene."

Discography

Albums

Singles

References

Canadian country singers
Canadian male singers
Living people
People from Dawson Creek
Year of birth missing (living people)
Musicians from British Columbia